The lesser broad-bordered yellow underwing or Langmaid's yellow underwing (Noctua janthina) is a moth of the family Noctuidae. It is distributed throughout southern and central Europe, and southern Sweden.
 

Like other members of its genus this species has bright orange-yellow hindwings but as the common name suggests the black sub-terminal bands are very broad and account for about half the area of the hindwings. The forewings are more cryptically marked but are generally more attractively marked than in its congenators, variegated in shades of buff and purplish-brown. The wingspan is 34–44 mm. This species can only be separated from Noctua janthe and the disputed Noctua tertia by examination of the genitalia. See Townsend et al.

The adults fly at night from the latter half of July to August and are attracted to light and sugar.

The larva is brown with v-shaped markings along the back. It feeds on a wide variety of plants (see list below). The species overwinters as a larva.

Recorded food plants
Arum – Cuckoo pint
Crataegus – Hawthorn
Hedera – Ivy
Primula
Prunus – Blackthorn
Rubus
Rumex
Salix – Willow
Ulmus – Elm
Urtica – Nettle
Viola

References

Further reading
Chinery, Michael Collins Guide to the Insects of Britain and Western Europe 1986 (Reprinted 1991)
Skinner, Bernard Colour Identification Guide to Moths of the British Isles 1984

Noctua (moth)
Moths described in 1775
Moths of Europe
Moths of the Middle East